Lee Yoo-mi (born July 18, 1994) is a South Korean actress. She is known for her roles as Ji-yeong in Squid Game (2021) and Lee Na-yeon in All of Us Are Dead (2022). For the former, she won the Primetime Emmy Award for Outstanding Guest Actress in a Drama Series and made her the first Korean actress to win in the category.

Early life
Lee was born on July 18, 1994, in Jeonju, South Korea.

Career
She began her acting career in 2010 with her debut in the action thriller film The Yellow Sea. In the following years, her work was limited to minor roles in several film and television series.

On September 28, 2020, it was announced that Lee has signed an exclusive contract with Varo Entertainment.

In 2021, Lee rose to prominence outside South Korea for her role of Ji-yeong (Number 240) in the Netflix series Squid Game. Following the series' international success, Lee's follower count on Instagram increased from 40,000 to over 6.5 million in a matter of days. Her performance made her the first Korean actress to win the Primetime Emmy Award for Outstanding Guest Actress in a Drama Series.

In 2022, Lee starred as Lee Na-yeon in the Netflix zombie-themed series All of Us Are Dead. Her realistic acting as the villainous, selfish and arrogant rich student (which contrasted with the sympathetic and selfless Ji-yeong from Squid Game) further propelled her to fame, in combination with her earlier popularity from Squid Game.

Philanthropy
On July 20, 2022, Lee donated cosmetic products worth  to a public foundation for burn patients.

Filmography

Film

Television series

Web series

Music video appearances

Awards and nominations

Listicles

References

External links
  
 

1994 births
Living people
People from Jeonju
21st-century South Korean actresses
South Korean television actresses
South Korean film actresses
South Korean web series actresses
Best New Actress Paeksang Arts Award (film) winners
Primetime Emmy Award winners